Vedran Jugović (born 10 September 1989) is a Croatian footballer, playing for NK Osijek  in the Prva HNL.

Club career

Osijek
Jugović started his career playing at youth level for Osijek, with whom he signed a professional contract in 2008. He collected over 100 caps for Osijek over five seasons, scoring eight goals.

Rijeka
In February 2013, Jugović was transferred to Rijeka together with his teammate Ivan Vargić. He made his debut for Rijeka in Round 21 1. HNL fixture against HNK Cibalia, coming on as a substitute in the 61st minute. He made 10 further appearances that season, collecting two assists and scoring in the final round of the season in a 4–1 win over NK Zagreb. The 2013–14 season was difficult for Jugović, with injuries hampering his performances. He managed 31 appearances in all competitions, including a game against Real Betis, his first in the UEFA Europa League. Until December 2015, he collected 100 caps for Rijeka in all competition, scoring seven goals.

Jeonnam
On 6 January 2016, HNK Rijeka announced that Jugović has been loaned to Jeonnam Dragons for one year with a buying option. On 10 October 2016, it was revealed that Jeonnam Dragons exercised their buying option for an estimated fee of €500,000. Jugović signed a three-year contract with the Korean club.

Career statistics

References

External links

1989 births
Living people
Footballers from Osijek
Association football midfielders
Croatian footballers
NK Osijek players
NK Olimpija Osijek players
HNK Rijeka players
Jeonnam Dragons players
Croatian Football League players
K League 1 players
Croatian expatriate footballers
Expatriate footballers in South Korea
Croatian expatriate sportspeople in South Korea